The Rosenhorn (3,689 m) is a peak in the Bernese Alps in the Bernese Oberland. It is lowest of the three composing the Wetterhorner massif, and most distant from the alpine village of Grindelwald to the southwest.

The Rosenhorn is entirely surrounded by glaciers: the Rosenlaui on the north side, the Upper Grindelwald on the south, and the Gauli on the east.

References

External links 

 Rosenhorn on Hikr
 www.wetterhorn.ch
 Wetterhorn on Summitpost
 Wetterhorn from Grindelwald First
 Wetterhorn from Eiger Trail

Mountains of Switzerland
Mountains of the Alps
Alpine three-thousanders
Bernese Alps
Mountains of the canton of Bern